Florian Pflügler (born 10 March 1992) is a German footballer.

References

External links
 
 

1992 births
Living people
German footballers
FC Bayern Munich II players
SV Wacker Burghausen players
SV Elversberg players
3. Liga players
Association football defenders
Association football midfielders
TSV Buchbach players
VfR Garching players
TSV 1860 Rosenheim players
People from Freising
Sportspeople from Upper Bavaria
Footballers from Bavaria